Döwletmämmet Azady ( Doulatmammed Āzādi) was a Turkmen poet and Sufi scholar. He is the father of poet Magtymguly Pyragy, the father of Turkmen literature.

Memory
The resting place of Azady and his son Magtymguly is located in Aktokai Cemetery, Golestan, Iran and is a place of pilgrimage. Every year, this cemetery becomes a place of pilgrimage for thousands of people.

Institutions and organizations
The Turkmen National Institute of World Languages is named after Azady.

References

1690s births
1760 deaths
Year of birth uncertain
Year of death uncertain
Scholars of Sufism
18th-century Iranian poets
Place of death missing
Ethnic Turkmen poets